Semyon Semyonovich Bogatyrev (15 February 189031 December 1960) was a Soviet and Russian musicologist and composer.

He is best known in the West for his completion of Pyotr Ilyich Tchaikovsky's Symphony in E-flat, which he abandoned while incomplete in 1892. In 1893 Tchaikovsky used the first movement as source material for his Piano Concerto No. 3 in E-flat, Op. 75. In 1897, Sergei Taneyev used the remaining movements as source for the Andante and Finale for piano and orchestra, which was published as Tchaikovsky's Op. posth. 79.

Between 1951 and 1955, Bogatyrev reconstructed the original Symphony in E-flat as he believed Tchaikovsky might have done had he not become disillusioned with it, and published it as the "Symphony No. 7 in E-flat". It was first performed in Moscow in 1957.

He also wrote a number of his own compositions.

1890 births
1960 deaths
20th-century composers
20th-century musicologists
20th-century Russian male musicians
Academic staff of Moscow Conservatory
National University of Kharkiv alumni
Saint Petersburg Conservatory alumni
Recipients of the Order of the Red Banner of Labour
Russian male composers
Russian music educators
Russian musicologists
Soviet male composers
Soviet music educators
Soviet musicologists